Woodbury Glacier is a glacier just west of Montgolfier Glacier, flowing into Piccard Cove, Wilhelmina Bay, on the west coast of Graham Land. Mapped by the Falkland Islands Dependencies Survey (FIDS) from air photos taken by Hunting Aerosurveys Ltd. in 1956–57. Named by the United Kingdom Antarctic Place-Names Committee (UK-APC) in 1960 for Walter B. Woodbury (1834–1885), English pioneer of photomechanical printing in 1865 and of serial film cameras for use in balloons and kites in 1877.

Glaciers of Danco Coast